Streakin Six (1977–2005) was an American Quarter Horse stallion and a famous racehorse as well as a breeding stallion. He was inducted into the American Quarter Horse Hall of Fame in 2011.

Life

Streakin Six was a 1977 stallion bred by the Tom L. Burnett Cattle Company of Fort Worth, Texas. Sired by Easy Six, Streakin Six was out of Miss Assured, a daughter of the Thoroughbred stallion Little Request.

Racing career 
During Streakin Six's racing career, he won the 1979 Rainbow Futurity, a graded stakes race, and was second in the 1979 All American Futurity, another graded stakes race. His record on the racetrack was 19 starts, 10 wins, 5 seconds and a third-place finish.

Death and honors 
Streakin Six died in December 2005. He was inducted into the AQHA Hall of Fame in 2011.

Pedigree

Notes

References

 

American Quarter Horse sires
American Quarter Horse racehorses
1977 racehorse births
2005 racehorse deaths
AQHA Hall of Fame (horses)